The 9th constituency of the Hauts-de-Seine is a French legislative constituency in the Hauts-de-Seine département.

Description

Hauts-de-Seine's 9th constituency is entirely composed of the town of Boulogne-Billancourt which lies just west of Paris and forms an exclusive and wealthy suburb.

The constituency has elected conservative deputies for its entire history. At the 2012 Thierry Solère a municipal councillor stood against the official UMP candidate Claude Guéant and won by a margin of less than 400 votes. Solère re-joined the UMP in 2013.

Historic Representative

Election results

2022

 
 
 
 
 
 
 
 
|-
| colspan="8" bgcolor="#E9E9E9"|
|-

2017

 
 
 
 
 
 
|-
| colspan="8" bgcolor="#E9E9E9"|
|-

2012

 
 
 
 
 
 
 
 
|-
| colspan="8" bgcolor="#E9E9E9"|
|-

2007

 
 
 
 
 
|-
| colspan="8" bgcolor="#E9E9E9"|
|-

2002

 
 
 
 
|-
| colspan="8" bgcolor="#E9E9E9"|
|-

1997

 
 
 
 
 
 
 
 
 
|-
| colspan="8" bgcolor="#E9E9E9"|
|-

Sources

 Official results of French elections from 1998: 

9